Sheryl Lynn Herring (born September 22, 1958) is an American soap opera actress. She is perhaps best known for her role as Lucy Coe on the long-running soap opera General Hospital which she has played on and off since 1986.

Early life
Herring was born in Enid, Oklahoma. Before acting, Herring was Miss Virginia USA 1977, and was 4th runner-up to Kimberly Tomes for the title of Miss USA 1977. She earned a B.A. in psychology from Louisiana State University, where she was also a member of Delta Delta Delta sorority.

Acting career
Herring is best known for her work in daytime television, first portraying the role of mousy librarian Lucy Coe on General Hospital in 1986. Over time, Lucy became much more glamorous and man-hungry, and the role proved to be very lucrative for Herring. She left after six years to explore other opportunities, which led to a role on Days of Our Lives. Her character, Lisanne Gardner, was never fully developed, and Herring asked to be let out of her contract with the show. Days producers agreed, and she then returned to General Hospital.

She played Lucy on General Hospital until 1997, when she was asked to reprise her character on a spin-off series called Port Charles. She appeared on the series until it was canceled in 2003, and subsequently made a brief return to General Hospital in 2004.

She joined the cast of As the World Turns on July 24, 2009 as Audrey Coleman.

On November 2, 2012, after more than eight years off-screen, it was announced that Herring would return to General Hospital as Lucy in December. She first aired on December 17.

Personal life
Herring married actor Wayne Northrop on May 9, 1981 in Jennings, Louisiana. They have two sons: Hank Wayne, born on January 9, 1991, and Grady Lee, born on July 20, 1993, in Los Angeles, CA. Northrop and Herring own and run a working cattle ranch in the Madera County area of Raymond.

In a February 2007 interview, Herring's former co-star Kin Shriner said of Herring: "She's living a life that most women would love. She's going to restore an old train depot on land up where she lives and bring it back to a sort of museum quality. She's lobbying. She's back at school. She's working with animals. She's got her two boys. She's like Barbara Stanwyck in The Big Valley. She's running the whole town."

Filmography

Awards and nominations

References

External links

1958 births
Living people
20th-century American actresses
Actresses from Oklahoma
American soap opera actresses
Louisiana State University alumni
Miss USA 1970s delegates
Actors from Enid, Oklahoma
21st-century American women